Paya Terubong is a suburb of George Town in Penang, Malaysia. It is also one of the most densely populated areas on Penang Island.

Paya Terubong first came into existence as an agricultural village. High-rise residences began to be built in the area in the 1980s, transforming Paya Terubong into a residential area.

Etymology 
Paya Terubong was named after a species of grass known in Malay as terubong. Its scientific name is Cyrtococcum oxyphyllum.

History 

Similar to Air Itam to the north, Paya Terubong was where agricultural farms were established, providing spices and vegetables to be traded in markets elsewhere on Penang Island. In the past, Paya Terubong Road was merely a hill path.

The area was only developed in the 1980s with the construction of residential high-rises to alleviate land scarcity on Penang Island. Hill slopes were cleared in the process. Initially, most of the residents worked in the Bayan Lepas Free Industrial Zone and commuted there via Jalan Paya Terubong, which is the only main road running through the area.

Among the more recent issues within Paya Terubong are the clearing of hills and daily traffic jams.

Transportation 
Paya Terubong Road remains the main thoroughfare within Paya Terubong. The road connects with Air Itam Road to the north and stretches towards the neighbourhood of Relau near the southern end of the central valleys. As Paya Terubong Road is the sole road which links the north and south of Penang Island through the central valleys, heavy traffic congestion occurs on a frequent basis. At the time of writing, construction of new roads and road expansions are being carried out to alleviate the daily traffic jams.

Rapid Penang buses 13, 201, 202, 306 and 502 serve the residents of the suburb, by connecting Paya Terubong with George Town to the northeast and other destinations on Penang Island, such as Air Itam, the Penang International Airport, Queensbay Mall and Balik Pulau. Aside from these routes, Paya Terubong is also served by Rapid Penang's Congestion Alleviation Transport (CAT) Air Itam route, a free-of-charge transit service that links Paya Terubong with Air Itam, Farlim and Rifle Range.

Education 
The nearest schools are situated at neighbouring Air Itam. However, this may change in the near future. , a Malaysian developer, Sunway Berhad, has submitted plans for a mixed development project at Paya Terubong, which will include a private college, to the Penang Island City Council.

Shopping 
The nearest supermarket is an Econsave outlet, which is actually located within the neighbourhood of Farlim, part of Air Itam. The upcoming mixed development project by Sunway, however, may include a shopping mall as well.

References

Populated places in Penang
George Town, Penang